The 2022 season was the California United Strikers FC's fifth season of existence, their third in the third division of American soccer and their third in the National Independent Soccer Association.

Background 

The 2020–21 season was split into three phases as the league moved from a winter to summer schedule. During the Fall 2020 season, the Strikers finished second in the Western Conference, and fourth in the overall league table, failing to qualify for the modified playoffs that were reduced due to the COVID-19 pandemic.

During the Spring 2021 segment of the season, the Strikers finished fourth in the table, and missed out on the championship game. In the Fall 2021 season, the Strikers finished second overall in the league.

Club

Management 

Sources:

First team roster

Transfers

Transfers in

Transfers out

Loans in

Competitions

Friendlies

NISA

Table

Results summary

Results by round

Match reports

NISA Playoffs

U.S. Open Cup

Statistics 

|}

References

External links 
 California United Strikers

2022
2022 National Independent Soccer Association season
American soccer clubs 2022 season
2022 in sports in California